Deudorix badhami is a butterfly in the family Lycaenidae. It is found in the Democratic Republic of the Congo (from the south-eastern part of the country to Lualaba) and Zambia.

References

Butterflies described in 1961
Deudorigini
Deudorix